Lokalise is a cloud-based localization and translation management system for agile teams. The company was founded in Riga, Latvia, and is a distributed company; all employees are remote workers. It has over 300 employees from over 25 countries.

History 
Lokalise was founded in 2017 by Nick Ustinov and Petr Antropov. In 2020, the company raised its first funds, reaching $6M in a series A round after bootstrapping for the 3 years following its foundation.

The founders decided to raise external capital to accelerate company growth. After raising one of the largest first-time investments for a Latvian-founded startup company, Lokalise went fully remote.

Since 2020, Nick Ustinov has been a member of the Forbes Technology Council.

In 2020, the company was named one of the top 100 European cloud companies valued under $1B by Accel.

In 2021, Sifted included Lokalise in the list of VC's 21 European SaaS startups to boom in 2021. The list was compiled by Bill Leaver from Sifted after consulting with industry leaders such as Evgenia Plotnikova, Ben Blume, Itxaso del Palacio, Carlos Gonzalez-Cadenas, and Dhruv Jain.

Product 
The software was designed primarily "for tech-driven teams managing iOS, Android apps, web, games, IoT or digital content, and software in general". It has been recognized for its "web-based collaborative editor, cross-platform projects and localization keys, automatic screenshot matching, numerous integration options, and plugins," as well as its time-saving features. Typical users include developers, product, project, and localization managers, designers, marketers, translators, and content managers.

Lokalise is used by more than 2,000 customers from 80 countries. Some notable customer names include Amazon, Gojek, Depositphotos, Revolut, Yelp, Virgin Mobile, and Notion.

References

External links 
 

Software-localization tools
Collaborative software